Snorre Krokus (born 25 May 1991) is a Norwegian footballer who plays as a midfielder.

He previously played for Odd Grenland in Tippeligaen, appearing in 28 of 30 league games in 2012. Ahead of the 2014 season he joined IF Fram.

Career statistics

References

1991 births
Living people
Sportspeople from Porsgrunn
Sportspeople from Skien
Norwegian footballers
Odds BK players
Halmstads BK players
Eliteserien players
Norwegian Second Division players
Allsvenskan players
Norwegian expatriate footballers
Expatriate footballers in Sweden

Association football forwards